For information on all University of Nevada, Las Vegas sports, see UNLV Rebels
The UNLV Rebels men's soccer team represents the University of Nevada, Las Vegas in all NCAA Division I men's college soccer competitions. The team currently competes in the Western Athletic Conference.

Team honors

Conference championships

Individual honors

All-Americans

All-Region

Current roster

Seasons

References

External links 
 

 
1974 establishments in Nevada
Association football clubs established in 1974